Anthurium clavigerum is a species of plant in the genus Anthurium. Native to Central and South America, it ranges from Honduras to central and western Brazil. This epiphyte has distinctive leaves that are deeply lobed and sometimes sinuous edges.

References

clavigerum
Plants described in 1845